Country Reports on Human Rights Practices are annual publications on the human rights conditions in countries and regions outside the United States, mandated by U.S. law to be submitted annually by the Bureau of Democracy, Human Rights, and Labor of the United States Department of State to the United States Congress. The reports cover internationally recognized individual, civil, political, and worker rights, as set forth in the Universal Declaration of Human Rights. The first report covered the year 1976, issued in 1977.

The People's Republic of China has responded to frequent criticism in this report by releasing a similar annual report titled the "Human Rights Record of the United States."

See also
 United States Hague Abduction Convention Compliance Reports

References

External links
Country Reports on Human Rights Practices from 1976-present
Remarks on Release of Country Reports on Human Rights Practices for 2004

Human rights in the United States
Reports of the United States government
United States Department of State publications
Publications established in 1977